Russ Sinkewich (born September 21, 1985) is an American former professional ice hockey defenseman. He last played with the Idaho Steelheads of the ECHL.

Playing career
Prior to turning professional, Sinkewich attended Bowling Green State University where he played four seasons of college hockey with the NCAA Division I Bowling Green Falcons men's ice hockey team.

In his fourth professional season in 2011–12, Sinkewich began for a second consecutive year with the Alaska Aces. He was again loaned to the Abbotsford Heat impressing in 21 games to be signed to an AHL contract by the Bridgeport Sound Tigers on February 29, 2012, for the remainder of the season.

Unable to attract AHL interest for the following season, Sinkewich returned to re-sign with the Alaska Aces for his third consecutive year. After 23 games with the Aces in the 2012–13 season, Sinkewich was traded to the Gwinnett Gladiators on December 13, 2012. He scored 3 goals in 11 games with the Gladiators before he attracted the interest of the Portland Pirates of the AHL where he remained for the duration of the year.

In the following off-season, Sinkewich's ECHL rights were initially traded by the Gladiators to the San Francisco Bulls on June 10, 2013. He was later traded on by the Bull's to the Colorado Eagles in exchange for Collin Bowman on August 27, 2013.

Career statistics

References

External links

1985 births
Living people
American men's ice hockey defensemen
Abbotsford Heat players
Alaska Aces (ECHL) players
Bowling Green Falcons men's ice hockey players
Bridgeport Sound Tigers players
Gwinnett Gladiators players
Ice hockey players from Ohio
Idaho Steelheads (ECHL) players
Johnstown Chiefs players
Lake Erie Monsters players
Lincoln Stars players
Milwaukee Admirals players
People from Westlake, Ohio
Portland Pirates players
Sportspeople from Cuyahoga County, Ohio
Texas Stars players
Toledo Walleye players